Pudendal anesthesia, also known as a pudendal block, or saddle block, is a form of local anesthesia commonly used in the practice of obstetrics to relieve pain during the delivery of baby by forceps. The pudendal nerve block prevents fainting during forceps delivery which was common before pudendal nerve block use was available. The anesthesia is produced by blocking the pudendal nerves near the ischial spine of the pelvis.  The ischial spine separates the greater and lesser sciatic foramina at the exit of the bony pelvis. 

The pudendal block gets its name because a local anesthetic, such as lidocaine or chloroprocaine, is injected into the pudendal canal where the pudendal nerve is located. This allows quick pain relief to the perineum, vulva, and vagina. A pudendal block is usually given in the second stage of labor just before delivery of the baby. It relieves pain around the vagina and rectum as the baby comes down the birth canal. It is also helpful just before an episiotomy. Lidocaine is usually preferred for a pudendal block because it has a longer duration than chloroprocaine which usually lasts less than one hour.

References

Anesthesia
Childbirth